Archips paredraea is a moth of the family Tortricidae. It is found in Taiwan.

References

Moths described in 1931
Archips
Moths of Taiwan